Timway is a web portal and directory primarily serving Hong Kong. Its Timway Hong Kong Search Engine is designed for searching web sites in Hong Kong. It supports web search query in English and Chinese, and indexes web pages in both languages.

The Timway Hong Kong Search Engine was introduced in 1997 by Tim Yu. It was the first directory in Traditional Chinese. It sorted results by popularity and freshness instead of alphabetical order.

Sina.com.hk used Timway in addition to Google for finding HK webpages. Yahoo also cooperate with Timway for the search engine marketing business. According to web traffic analysis company of Alexa, Timway is of the top ten websites in Hong Kong by 2009, ordered by popularity.

Timway grew, and now also sells webhosting and other services.

History
The search engine was first created by its founder Tim Yu in July 1997. As an engineer and a remarkably book lover, Yu discovered that a Hong Kong-oriented search engine would be way more effective in processing massive data (in both English AND Chinese) and allow user to get the exact useful information. Seeing the great potential in this area, Yu started a searchable directory in Hong Kong even earlier than Yahoo!HK, which marked a milestone in the developments of HK search portal business.

Milestones:
 Founded in July 1997 by Tim Yu, using a former domain name of hksrch.com.
 Registered as a Hong Kong registered company in February 1998.
 Changed the domain name to timway.com in 1999.
 Education portal was established in 2000.  A wide range of education courses are supplied. The cooperation with tens of education providers makes it an education supermarket, thus finding education courses becomes convenient.
 Starting from 2005, Timway appoints Professor Michael Chau as the senior technology advisor.
 By 2009, Timway is of the top ten websites in Hong Kong according to web traffic analysis company of Alexa, ranked by popularity.
 Timway ran a website called Timway Quiz before.  It made use of the technology of Coldfusion for enhanced interactivity with the users.
 Few academic studies examined user information seeking behavior when using non-English search engine and Timway is one of the few contributed to this.

 Timway began to provide eCommerce solution starting from 2000.  
 Timway started to offer digital marketing services to clients starting from 2012, helps matching potential consumers with related businesses through various online channels.
 Timway developed Online Food Ordering Platform in 2015, helping restaurants handle take away orders in shorter time, lower cost and offered great convenience to customers.

See also
 List of web directories
 Search engine marketing

References

External links
Official Website
Earlier known as hksrch website from 1998
Earlier known as timway website from 1999

Hong Kong websites
Web directories
Web portals